Fernando Lopes (21 November 1964 –  11 October 2020) was an Angolan swimmer. He competed in the men's 4 × 100 metre medley relay at the 1980 Summer Olympics. At the age of 15, he was the youngest athlete in the delegation from Angola.

Lopes died in October 2020 at the age of 55.

References

External links
 

1964 births
2020 deaths
Angolan male swimmers
Olympic swimmers of Angola
Swimmers at the 1980 Summer Olympics
Place of birth missing